Thomas Stuart Francis "Tom" Fletcher CMG (born 27 March 1975) is the Principal of Hertford College, Oxford. He was formerly a British diplomat, a writer, and a campaigner.

From 2011 to 2015, he was the British Ambassador to Lebanon. He is a Visiting Professor at New York University and author of The Naked Diplomat (2016) and “Ten Survival Skills for a World in Flux” (2022).

Early life
Fletcher was born in Kent and educated at The Harvey Grammar School and Hertford College, Oxford, where he was awarded first class honours in Modern History. He was Junior Common Room President at Hertford College.

Career
Fletcher joined the Diplomatic Service and served as a British diplomat in Nairobi and Paris, and as the Private Secretary to FCO Ministers Baroness Valerie Amos and Chris Mullin. While in Kenya, he took part in a high profile charity boxing match with the Mayor of Nairobi, who had t-shirts printed saying "Fletcher goes home on a stretcher".

Between 2007 and 2011, Fletcher was the 10, Downing Street, foreign policy and Northern Ireland adviser to Prime Ministers Tony Blair, Gordon Brown, and David Cameron, and ended his Foreign Office career as British Ambassador to the Lebanon from 2011 to 2015. In his memoirs, Gordon Brown called him "indispensable and indefatigable." In "For The Record", David Cameron wrote "There was one man who would prove essential: Tom Fletcher. Tom became my support, sounding board and source of information about virtually every country on Earth."

Fletcher is a Visiting Professor of International Relations at New York University, a Visiting Professor at the Emirates Diplomatic Academy, and an adviser to the Global Business Coalition for Education. He became an Honorary Fellow of Hertford College, and in November 2019 was elected as the next Principal of the College, taking up the post in September 2020.

British Ambassador to Lebanon
While in Beirut, Fletcher pioneered a more open style of diplomacy, with many of his blogposts going viral (Dear Lebanon and Yalla Bye). The BBC made a documentary, "The Naked Diplomat", about his work. He led UK initiatives on refugee education, job creation and border security. The Daily Telegraph reported that he was behind a secret plan which prevented Islamic State from entering Lebanon from Syria. The UK government budget for Lebanon increased from £2m in 2011 to £200m in 2015.

In partnership with Banque du Liban, Fletcher spearheaded the launch of the UK Lebanon Tech Hub, an international accelerator using London as a platform for Lebanese technology businesses to grow internationally. By December 2018, the hub had helped grow 91 startups raise more than $64 million in venture funding and create more than 2000 jobs in Lebanon and the United Kingdom.

Fletcher caused controversy by donating blood after a terrorist attack against the Iranian embassy in Beirut, and becoming a domestic worker to highlight migrant rights. He founded One Lebanon, an annual concert bringing together Lebanese celebrities from across the sectarian divide.

Arab News described him as “the anti-diplomat.” Not in the sense that he sees no value in diplomacy, but in his steadfast refusal to live up to the stereotype expected of the ambassadorial profession. He was commended by many commentators for his viral online farewell which resurrected the old Foreign Officer tradition of the valedictory despatch. In Dec 2015, Fletcher was awarded the Lovie Special Achievement award for his use of social media during his time as British Ambassador in Lebanon.

Global Education
Fletcher is the Project Director of Towards Global Learning Goals – a network that aims to create equal opportunities, to develop the skills needed to thrive in a new economy, and to make it easier for people on the move to adapt. His five-part podcast series focused on learning of the head, hand and heart. Since 2017, he has led a review on the future of learning trying to understand how we can help the next generation learn the right things in the right way.

He is a Visiting Professor of International Relations at New York University, where he teaches a course on "Surviving the 21st Century: Power and Statecraft in the Digital Age", and supports the effort to expand peace and global citizenship studies.

Diplomacy

In 2016, he led a review of British diplomacy for the UK Foreign Office tasked by Sir Simon McDonald. According to the Financial Times, he was trying to make the FCO "more like 24, and less like The Good Life." As a result of the report, the FCO accelerated the effort to appoint women ambassadors and overhauled IT.

His book, The Naked Diplomat: Power and Statecraft in the Digital Age, was published by Harper Collins on 2 June 2016, and was the best selling book on diplomacy by a British writer and has been launched in over twenty countries. Former prime minister Gordon Brown called it "diplomatic genius", and former PM David Cameron wrote that it was "a great read from a brilliant diplomat". The Times called it "a brilliant, funny polemic ... a cracking read".  The Guardian called it "a call for us all to reconsider our place in society ... to be brave, creative, involved and connected." The New Statesman called it "articulate, intelligent and immensely readable."

In September 2017, he published a report on the future of the United Nations on how technology can help the UN. Drawing on contributions from young people, technology gurus, civil society, governments and business, it sets out twenty concrete ideas that can help the UN ready itself for the Digital Age.

Fletcher was recently ranked the fourth most influential international personality in the Middle East.

Tech and the future

He chairs the International Board of the Creative Industries Federation promoting Britain’s most dynamic and magnetic sector overseas. He is also a Board Member of the Dubai Future Academy.

He is a member of the Global Tech Panel, co-chaired by EU Vice President Federica Mogherini and Microsoft President Brad Smith. With a mandate about how best tech can help meet the SDGs, what to do about the challenges and opportunities of AI, how to build a stronger international system for the 21st century, and the threat of lethal autonomous weapons.

The Foundation for Opportunity

In 2018, he founded The Foundation for Opportunity, which supports good people doing good things in public life. The Foundation brings great people together to share ideas, skills, and experience, and support future leaders to deliver positive change in their communities.

Personal life
He is married to Dr Louise Fletcher, an Irish psychologist. They have two sons. According to The Sunday Times and a video Fletcher recorded on social media, while in 10 Downing Street Fletcher collected a book of advice for his sons from world leaders, including Barack Obama, George W Bush and Bill Clinton.

References

External links
Tom Fletcher's Personal Website

1975 births
Living people
People educated at The Harvey Grammar School
Alumni of Hertford College, Oxford
Ambassadors of the United Kingdom to Lebanon
Companions of the Order of St Michael and St George
Principals of Hertford College, Oxford